Rob James may refer to:

Rob James (singer) (born 1977), Canadian pop singer
Rob James (guitarist), member of The Clarks

See also
Rob James-Collier (born 1976), British actor and model
Robbie James (1957–1998), Welsh international footballer
Robert James (disambiguation)
Bob James (disambiguation)